The enzyme S-formylglutathione hydrolase (EC 3.1.2.12) catalyzes the reaction 

S-formylglutathione + H2O  glutathione + formate

This enzyme belongs to the family of hydrolases, specifically those acting on thioester bonds.  The systematic name  is ''S''-formylglutathione hydrolase. It participates in methane metabolism.

References

 
 
 

EC 3.1.2
Enzymes of unknown structure